Maxwell House is a historic home located near Stedman, Cumberland County, North Carolina. It consists of two sections: a coastal cottage form log section dated to about 1790–1815 and a two-story, five bay, transitional Federal / Greek Revival style section dated to about 1845.  Also on the property are the contributing dairy, a shed, cinder block smokehouse, a tin roof stable, and a diminutive slave kitchen.

It was listed on the National Register of Historic Places in 1985.

References

Houses on the National Register of Historic Places in North Carolina
Federal architecture in North Carolina
Greek Revival houses in North Carolina
Houses completed in 1815
Houses in Cumberland County, North Carolina
National Register of Historic Places in Cumberland County, North Carolina